"Så länge vi har varann" is a single released by Swedish band Ratata and Frida in 1987. It reached number five in Sweden (Sverigetopplistan). It also spent 21 weeks in the top ten of the Svensktoppen chart, reaching a highest position of number two on 7 June 1987. An English version, "As Long as I Have You", was also released.

Music video 
Two versions of the music video were produced. One for each language.

References

1987 singles
Swedish pop songs
Anni-Frid Lyngstad songs
1987 songs